Thiotetrabarbital (INN; Thionarcex) is a drug which is a short-acting barbiturate derivative that is used as an anesthetic. It has been used in veterinary medicine.

See also 
 Barbiturate

References 

General anesthetics
Thiobarbiturates
GABAA receptor positive allosteric modulators